

Consort may refer to:

Music
 "The Consort" (Rufus Wainwright song), from the 2000 album Poses
 Consort of instruments, term for instrumental ensembles
 Consort song (musical), a characteristic English song form, late 16th–early 17th centuries

Places
 Consort, Alberta, a village in Alberta, Canada
 Consort Islands, two small islands in the Dion Islands, Marguerite Bay, Antarctica
 Consort Mountain, in the Victoria Cross Ranges, Alberta, Canada

Titles
A spouse, concubine or companion, in particular the spouse of a reigning monarch.
Queen consort, wife of a reigning king
 Prince consort, husband of a reigning princess or queen
 King consort, rarely used alternative title for husband of a reigning queen
 Princess consort, wife of a reigning prince; also, rarely used alternative title for wife of a reigning king
Viceregal consort of Canada, spouse of the Governor General of Canada

Other uses
 Consolidated Standards of Reporting Trials (CONSORT), reporting standards for clinical trials
 Consort (nautical), unpowered, fully loaded Great Lakes vessels towed by larger vessels
 Consort Airport, Consort, Alberta, Canada
 CONSORT Colleges, a consortium of college libraries in the U.S. state of Ohio
 HMS Consort (R76), a C-class destroyer of the British Royal Navy
The Consort, novel by Sara Jeannette Duncan 1912
The Consort, musical journal of the Dolmetsch Foundation
 The female partner in tantric yab-yum

See also
 Consortium (disambiguation)
 Concert (disambiguation)